Bula is a small town and kecamatan on the northeastern coast of the Indonesian island of Seram. It is the capital of the East Seram Regency. According to the 2010 census, the district had a population of 24,037 people, but it has subsequently been split into three separate districts, with the reduced Bula district having a population of 15,812 at 2014. In the vicinity are the Bula Fields, with notable oil reserves, which were established in 1919. A number of people in the district speak the Masiwang language.

References

Populated places in Seram Island
East Seram Regency
Oil fields of Indonesia
Regency seats of Maluku (province)